Daud Khel, is a town of Mianwali District, Punjab, Pakistan.

Location
The town is located at 32°52'60N 71°34'0E at an altitude of 207 meters

35 kilometer far from District Mianwali from north side, Nearest city Kalabagh

Population
The town's population is approximately 1 lakh. Some 70% of the population lives in urban areas while 30% lives in suburban villages.
What is special about this city is that there are 60% more males than females.
The population lives in the Mohallahs.
These include Mohalla shrif khel oner of the 80/property in Daud khel other. Mohalla Salar, Mohalla Amirekhel,Mohalla Janoobi Wandhi, Mohalla New Wandhi, Mohalla Bahram Khel, Mohalla Shakur Khel, Mohalla Daukhel, Mohalla Lamekhel, Mohalla Alawal Khel, Mohalla Ghazni Khel, Mohalla Samal Khel, Mohalla and Mohalla Hussainabad.

References

Populated places in Mianwali District
Union councils of Mianwali District